is a Japanese national park, comprising areas of Japan's Seto Inland Sea, and of ten bordering prefectures. Designated a national park in 1934, it has since been expanded several times. It contains about 3,000 islands, known as the Setouchi Islands, including the well-known Itsukushima. As the park encompasses many non-contiguous areas, and covers a tiny proportion of the Inland Sea's total extent, control and protection is problematic; much of the wider area is heavily industrialized.

History
In 1934, when the area was envisioned as Japan’s first national park, it was far smaller than the expanse of today. Sixteen years later, in 1950, an expansion would seek to include other iconic sites in the region, bringing the total area roughly up to that of the present-day. Setonaikai is the biggest national park in Japan.

In 1996, Itsukushima Shrine (in Hiroshima prefecture) was registered as a “cultural site of world heritage” by UNESCO. It is known as one of the top three “most scenic spots” in Japan.

In the 1960s and 1970s, a period of rapid economic growth was fueled in Japan, resulting in industrial contamination of the surrounding environment. In both fresh and ocean waters, unmonitored chemical runoff led to reduced water quality, mainly due to area farms’ use of synthetic fertilizers, pesticides, and herbicides. Detrimental levels of heavy metals began to rise, gradually affecting the natural food chain and greater ecosystem. Starting in the 1980s (and continuing on into the present day), water quality has been drastically improved; stricter regulations on chemical use and runoff would be enforced, as well as advancements in technology, namely a high-performance sewage disposal.

Climate
Setonaikai National Park maintains relatively mild temperatures throughout the year, so the climate is sometimes referred to as “Mediterranean”; in essence, the average temperature in winter rarely dips below freezing, or above 90°F (around 30°C) in the summer.

Sites
There are numerous sightseeing places in the national park. Kanmon Strait is one of them. It is between Honshu and Kyushu. A suspension bridge called Kanmon Bridge spans the strait. In 1973, when it was opened for the public, it was the longest bridge (0.66 miles) in Asia.

The Naruto whirlpools in Tokushima prefecture are tidal whirlpools in the Naruto Strait, a channel between Naruto and Awaji Island in Hyogo prefecture. The whirlpools, one of the prefecture’s major tourist attractions, are formed due to a narrow width (0.8 miles) of the strait and a water level of 5.6 feet between the Inland Sea and the Open Sea caused by the ebb and flow of the tide. It sometimes creates a whirlpool 100 feet in diameter.

Facilities
There are facilities where people can experience and learn about nature in the park. Mt. Rokko Nature Conservation Center and Mt. Rokko Guide House in Hyogo prefecture are places where people can find natural specimens of Mt. Rokko.

Wasuzan Business Center is in Okayama prefecture. It stands on the top of Washuzan Mountain. It is near Seto-ohashi Bridge which is a series of ten bridges between Okayama and Kagawa prefectures. The total length is 8.1 miles (13.1 km). From the center, people can see the panorama of the bridge and the Inland Sea. It is possible to learn about the nature around the bridge and the history of the Inland Sea.

Natural areas
 Islands: Awaji Island (part), Bōyo Islands, Ieshima, Miyajima, Naoshima, Shiwaku Islands, Shōdoshima, Tomogashima
 Mountains: Mount Rokkō, Mount Maya, Mount Noro
 Straits: Akashi Strait, Hōyo Strait, Kitan Strait, Naruto Strait, Kanmon Straits
 Other: Naruto whirlpools

Cultural sites
 Shrines: Itsukushima Jinja, Kotohira-gū, Mekari Shrine
 Temples: Futago-ji, Yashima-ji

Related municipalities
The park crosses the borders of 55 cities, 14 towns, and one village:
 Ehime: Ikata, Imabari, Kamijima, Matsuyama, Ōzu, Saijō, Yawatahama
 Fukuoka: Kitakyushu
 Hiroshima: Etajima, Fukuyama, Hatsukaichi, Higashihiroshima, Hiroshima, Kure, Mihare, Onomichi, Ōsakikamijima, Ōtake, Saka, Takehara
 Hyōgo: Aioi, Akashi, Akō, Ashiya, Awaji, Himeji, Kobe, Minamiawaji, Nishinomiya, Sumoto, Takarazuka, Tatsuno
 Kagawa: Higashikagawa, Kan'onji, Kotohira, Mannō, Marugame, Mitoyo, Naoshima, Sakaide, Sanuki, Shōdoshima, Tadotsu, Takamatsu, Tonoshō, Zentsūji
 Ōita: Bungotakada, Himeshima, Kunisaki, Ōita
 Okayama: Asakuchi, Bizen, Kasaoka, Kurashiki, Okayama, Setouchi, Tamano
 Tokushima: Naruto
 Wakayama: Wakayama
 Yamaguchi: Hikari, Hirao, Hōfu, Iwakuni, Kaminoseki, Kudamatsu, Shimonoseki, Shūnan, Suō-Ōshima, Tabuse, Yanai

See also

List of national parks of Japan

References

External links
  Setonaikai National Park
  Setonaikai National Park
 Map of Setonaikai National Park - Area 1
 Map of Setonaikai National Park - Area 2
 Map of Setonaikai National Park - Area 3
 Map of Setonaikai National Park - Area 4

National parks of Japan
Parks and gardens in Ehime Prefecture
Parks and gardens in Ōita Prefecture
Parks and gardens in Hiroshima Prefecture
Parks and gardens in Kagawa Prefecture
Parks and gardens in Hyōgo Prefecture
Parks and gardens in Wakayama Prefecture
Parks and gardens in Okayama Prefecture
Parks and gardens in Yamaguchi Prefecture
Parks and gardens in Tokushima Prefecture
Parks and gardens in Fukuoka Prefecture
Protected areas established in 1934
1934 establishments in Japan